Baghcheh may refer to:
 Baghcheh Jiq, Ardabil
 Baghcheh-ye Jonubi, Bushehr Province
 Baghcheh-ye Shomali, Bushehr Province
 Baghcheh Jiq, East Azerbaijan Province
 Baghcheh Jiq, alternate name of Taghcheh Jiq, East Azerbaijan Province
 Baghcheh Boneh, Gilan Province
 Baghcheh, Hamadan
 Baghcheh, Kabudarahang, Hamadan Province
 Baghcheh-ye Jalil, Kohgiluyeh and Boyer-Ahmad Province
 Baghcheh-ye Maryam, Kurdistan Province
 Baghcheh, Khvaf, Razavi Khorasan Province
 Baghcheh, Mashhad, Razavi Khorasan Province
 Baghcheh, Semnan
 Baghcheh, Behi-e Feyzolah Beygi, Bukan County, West Azerbaijan Province
 Baghcheh, Il Teymur, Bukan County, West Azerbaijan Province
 Baghcheh Juq, West Azerbaijan Province
 Baghcheh, Zanjan
 Baghcheh Ghaz (disambiguation)